Harpalus somereni is a species of ground beetle in the subfamily Harpalinae. It was described by Basilewsky in 1946.

References

somereni
Beetles described in 1946